Teater Paradižnik is a Slovenian television comedy series, created and directed by Branko Đurić.

Screenplay was written by Marko Pokorn and Branko Đurić. This show lasted from 1994 to 1997 and was a huge hit in Slovenia. It was broadcast on first channel of RTV Slovenija, a Slovenian national television.

The story was set in theater. There was a lot of comic situations between workers behind the scenes; and a part on a stage with public and Slovenian music performances on the other side.

Main characters
Marijana (Tanja Ribič)...confused theater stage speaker
Vinko (Janez Škof)...nervous theater show director
Veso (Jernej Šugman)...chilled doorman from Bosnia, admissing all the guest and performers with his humor
Hubert (Ivan Rupnik)...serious theater chairman with a bad breath
Edwin (Jožef Ropoša)...gay wardrobe and make-up artist
Scenci/Scene workers...group of crazy workers helping a director by setting stage sceneries
Fani Mkombo (Metka Trdin)...cleaning lady
Hinko (Gojmir Lešnjak)...funny fireman
Plesalke Paradižnik/Paradižnik dancers...theater dancing girls

External links
Teater Paradižnik at Viktorji si (Slovene)

Slovenian television series
1990s Slovenian television series
1994 Slovenian television series debuts
1997 Slovenian television series endings
Radiotelevizija Slovenija original programming